Acrossocheilus beijiangensis is a species of ray-finned fish in the genus Acrossocheilus from southern China.
Its common name is the Thick-lipped Barbel.It can reach the length of 13 cm.

References

Beijiangensis
Taxa named by Wu Hsien-Wen
Taxa named by Lin Ren-Duan
Fish described in 1977